Zimnowoda may refer to the following places:
Zimnowoda, Greater Poland Voivodeship (west-central Poland)
Zimnowoda, Masovian Voivodeship (east-central Poland)
Zimnowoda, Świętokrzyskie Voivodeship (south-central Poland)
Zimnowoda, Silesian Voivodeship (south Poland)